Daniel James O'Sullivan (born March 3, 1968) is an American former professional basketball player.

A 6′10″ (2.08 m), 250 lb (114 kg) center born in The Bronx, New York, O'Sullivan attended Fordham University. He played with the Omaha Racers of the Continental Basketball Association, and from the 1990–91 NBA season until 1996, he played with five different NBA teams: Utah Jazz (1990–91), New Jersey Nets (1992–93), Milwaukee Bucks (1992–93), Detroit Pistons (1993–94) and Toronto Raptors (1995–96). He has played for Washington Bullets during the 1993 pre-season (but not in the regular season). He also played with Kinder Bologna, Teamsystem Bologna and Scavolini in the Italian league, and also in Greece for AEK (1999–2000).

Career statistics

NBA

|-
| align="left" | 1990–91
| align="left" | Utah
| 21 || 0 || 4.0 || .438 || .000 || .636 || 0.8 || 0.2 || 0.0 || 0.0 || 1.0
|-
| align="left" | 1992–93
| align="left" | New Jersey
| 3 || 0 || 3.3 || .667 || .000 || .000 || 1.3 || 0.0 || 0.0 || 0.0 || 1.3
|-
| align="left" | 1992–93
| align="left" | Milwaukee
| 3 || 0 || 2.3 || .500 || .000 || .750 || 0.7 || 0.3 || 0.3 || 0.0 || 1.7
|-
| align="left" | 1993–94
| align="left" | Detroit
| 13 || 0 || 4.3 || .333 || .000 || .750 || 0.8 || 0.2 || 0.0 || 0.0 || 1.3
|-
| align="left" | 1995–96
| align="left" | Toronto
| 5 || 2 || 27.8 || .371 || .000 || .875 || 6.4 || 0.4 || 0.4 || 0.8 || 6.6
|- class="sortbottom"
| style="text-align:center;" colspan="2"| Career
| 45 || 2 || 6.6 || .397 || .000 || .743 || 1.4 || 0.2 || 0.1 || 0.1 || 1.8
|}

College

|-
| align="left" | 1986–87
| align="left" | Fordham
| 18 || - || 6.2 || .524 || - || .462 || 1.4 || 0.1 || - || - || 1.6
|-
| align="left" | 1987–88
| align="left" | Fordham
| 33 || - || 28.5 || .568 || - || .667 || 5.8 || 0.7 || - || - || 9.8
|-
| align="left" | 1988–89
| align="left" | Fordham
| 29 || - || 30.9 || .454 || .000 || .686 || 7.4 || 1.4 || - || - || 10.8
|-
| align="left" | 1989–90
| align="left" | Fordham
| 33 || - || 32.2 || .489 || .000 || .578 || 7.5 || 2.0 || - || - || 12.5
|- class="sortbottom"
| style="text-align:center;" colspan="2"| Career
| 113 || - || 26.6 || .501 || .000 || .634 || 6.0 || 1.2 || - || - || 9.5
|}

References

External links
 Player profile at AEK 
 NBA stats at Basketball-reference 
 Italian stats @ legabasket.it 
 stats at fibaeurope

1968 births
Living people
AEK B.C. players
American expatriate basketball people in Canada
American expatriate basketball people in Greece
American expatriate basketball people in Italy
American expatriate basketball people in Spain
American men's basketball players
Basketball players from New York City
Centers (basketball)
Detroit Pistons players
Fordham Rams men's basketball players
Fortitudo Pallacanestro Bologna players
Irish men's basketball players
Liga ACB players
Milwaukee Bucks players
New Jersey Nets players
Omaha Racers players
Saski Baskonia players
Shreveport Storm players
Sportspeople from the Bronx
Toronto Raptors players
Undrafted National Basketball Association players
Utah Jazz players
Victoria Libertas Pallacanestro players
Virtus Bologna players